Alyxia oblongata, commonly known as the chain fruit, prickly lixy, or prickly Alyxia, is a plant in the dogbane  family Apocynaceae endemic to a small part of northeastern Queensland.

Description
They are elliptic with a sharp, rigid tip and have up to 20 lateral veins.

The flowers are typical of the family, being white with five sepals and petals and a long corolla tube. The fruit are orange/red in colour and may be moniliform, i.e. with the appearance of a string of beads.

Taxonomy
This species was first described in 1928 by the Czech botanist Karel Domin, who published his description in Bibliotheca Botanica. In 1992 the Australian botanist Paul Forster redefined it as a subspecies of Alyxia ruscifolia, namely A.r. ssp. major, however this combination is no longer accpted by most authorities.

Etymolgy
The genus name Alyxia is derived from the Greek language word álysos, "chain", which refers to the chain-like appearance of the fruit. The species epithet oblongata is from "oblong" and again refers to the appearance of the fruit.

Distribution and habitat
The chain fruit is endemic to northeastern Queensland, from near Cooktown to the southern Atherton Tablelands.

Conservation
This species is listed by the Queensland Department of Environment and Science as least concern. , it has not been assessed by the IUCN.

Gallery

References

External links
 
 
 View a map of historical sightings of this species at the Australasian Virtual Herbarium
 View observations of this species on iNaturalist
 View images of this species on Flickriver

oblongata
Endemic flora of Queensland
Taxa named by Karel Domin
Plants described in 1928